is a Japanese television host, actor, news presenter, radio personality. He was the leader of the now defunct boy band SMAP, which had been the best-selling boy band in Asia. While working as a member of a boy band, he worked extensively as a television presenter, hosting many of his own talk shows, variety shows, music shows, news programs, and several Olympic games as a sportscaster. His conversational method and technique has been critically praised, establishing himself as one of the most well-respected, iconic hosts in the Japanese entertainment industry. He is the host of six weekly television programs and one radio program.

Since his first major role in the drama television series, Aji Ichimonme (1995), he has had a successful acting career, both in television and film. He has starred in many high-rated television series such as, Densetsu no Kyoushi (2000), Shiroi Kage (2001), Suna no Utsuwa (2004), and Ataru (2012), and a blockbuster film, Watashi wa Kai ni Naritai (2008).
 
He is credited for changing the Japanese entertainment industry, becoming the first non-comedian celebrity to have a career as a television host and expanding the capacity of a boy band. He is one of the wealthiest and highest-paid celebrities in Japan, identified as the highest tax payer in the Japanese entertainment industry by the Japanese National Tax Bureau in 2003.

Early life
Nakai was born in Kugenuma, Fujisawa, Kanagawa as the youngest of three brothers. He is a big fan of baseball.

In March 2017, he was rumored to be in a relationship with Maika Takeda, a 32-year-old choreographer by the tabloid, Josei Seven.

Career

Music

In 1986, at age 14, Nakai auditioned to enter Johnny & Associates, a Japanese talent agency that recruits and trains young boys, preteens to teens, to become singers and members of boy bands. After five of the other band members auditioning individually the following year, in autumn 1987, twenty boys, from ages ten to seventeen, were put together into a group called The Skate Boys, which was initially created as backup dancers for a famous boy band, Hikaru Genji. In April 1988, producer Johnny Kitagawa chose six out of the twenty boys to create a new boy band and named them "SMAP". Nakai, being the oldest of the group, was chosen to become the leader.

Acting
In 1988, he made his acting debut in a television series, Abunai Shonen III, along with his band members. After several supporting roles, in 1995, he landed his first major role in a drama television series, Aji Ichimonme. Following its success, he established himself as a leading man, starring in many high-rated television series such as, Densetsu no Kyoushi (2000), Shiroi Kage (2001), Suna no Utsuwa (2004), and Ataru (2012). In 2008, he starred in a blockbuster film, Watashi wa Kai ni Naritai (2008).

Television
At age 16, he decided that he wanted a professional career as a television presenter while working as a member of a boy band and started to actively participate in variety programs with popular comedians. In 1996, he launched his first self-titled television program, Nakai-kun Onsen. In 1997, he became the youngest male presenter to host the Kohaku Uta Gassen, at age 25. He hosts three weekly prime-time television programs three late-night programs and one radio program, as of 2016; SMAPxSMAP since 1996, The Sekai Gyoten News and Kinyoubi no Sma tachi e since 2001, Nakai no Mado since 2012, Mi ni Naru Toshokan since 2013, and Momm since 2015. He occasionally hosts TV specials, such as Kohaku Uta Gassen, 27 Hour Television, and a ten-hour long music program, Ongaku no Hi.

Sportscaster
From 1995, he started utilizing his knowledge on sports, serving as a sports commentator on Sunday Jungle, from 1995 to 2000. In 2004, he officially launched his career as a sportscaster, after becoming the host of the 2004 Summer Olympics and has hosted seven Olympic games during their television coverage on TBS. He has also served as the play-by-play commentator for several baseball tournaments, such as the World Baseball Classics.

Other ventures

Philanthropy

Product endorsement
 Nissin Foods "Hyoe Don" (2004–2015)
 Nippon TV
 Mitsubishi Motors Mirage, Mirage Asti, RVR
 Coca-Cola Zero (2015–2016)
 The Idolmaster Cinderella Girls: Starlight Stage (2015–)

Filmography

Television (as personality)

Television (as actor)

Film

Radio

Theatre

Discography

Awards and nominations

Publications
 Music Clamp: SMAP MIND Vol.1 (1997) 
 Music Clamp: SMAP MIND Vol.2 (1997) 
 Music Clamp: SMAP MIND Vol.3 (1997) 
 Music Clamp: SMAP MIND Vol.4 (1997) 
 Shifuku Darake no Nakai Masahiro Zokango Kagayaite (August 18, 2009) 
 Shifuku Darake no Nakai Masahiro Zokango Kagayaite Part2 (December 11, 2012) 
 Shifuku Darake no Nakai Masahiro Zokango Kagayaite Part3 (January 15, 2013)  
 Shifuku Darake no Nakai Masahiro Zokango Kagayaite Part4 (April 18, 2014)

References

External links

1972 births
Living people
SMAP members
Japanese idols
Japanese male pop singers
Japanese television personalities
People from Fujisawa, Kanagawa
Musicians from Kanagawa Prefecture
21st-century Japanese singers
21st-century Japanese male singers
Japanese male actors